Rathouisia pantherina is a species of carnivorous air-breathing land slug, terrestrial pulmonate gastropod mollusk in the family Rathouisiidae.

The specific name pantherina is from Latin word "pantherinus", that means "panther-like", referring to the predatory nature of the slug.

Distribution 
This species occurs in China.

Description
Rathouisia pantherina is smaller than Rathouisia leonina.

Ecology 
Rathouisia pantherina is a predatory carnivorous slug.

References

Rathouisiidae
Gastropods of Asia
Invertebrates of China
Gastropods described in 1882
Taxa named by Pierre Marie Heude